Pavel Chaloupka (born 4 May 1959 in Most) is a former Czech football player.

Chaloupka played for several clubs, including Dukla Prague (1980), Bohemians Praha (1980–1989) and Fortuna Düsseldorf (1989–1990).

He played for the Czechoslovakia national team (20 matches and two goals), and was a participant at the 1982 FIFA World Cup.

References

External links 
 Pavel Chaloupka at ČMFS 
 

1959 births
Living people
Czech footballers
Czechoslovak footballers
1982 FIFA World Cup players
Czechoslovakia international footballers
Bohemians 1905 players
Dukla Prague footballers
FK Teplice players
Fortuna Düsseldorf players
Berliner FC Dynamo players
Bundesliga players
2. Bundesliga players
Sportspeople from Most (city)
Czechoslovak expatriate footballers
Czechoslovak expatriate sportspeople in West Germany
Expatriate footballers in West Germany
Expatriate footballers in East Germany
DDR-Oberliga players
Association football midfielders
Czechoslovak expatriate sportspeople in East Germany